Jonas Björkman was the defending champion, but chose to compete at Halle during the same week, losing in the second round.

Cédric Pioline defeated qualifier Kevin Ullyett 6–3, 7–5 in the final to secure the title.

Seeds

  Greg Rusedski (semifinals)
  Jérôme Golmard (second round)
  Vincent Spadea (first round)
  Sébastien Grosjean (second round)
  Marc Rosset (first round)
  Byron Black (first round)
  Lleyton Hewitt (quarterfinals)
  Scott Draper (first round)

Draw

Finals

Section 1

Section 2

Qualifying

Qualifying seeds

Qualifiers

Qualifying draw

First qualifier

Second qualifier

Third qualifier

Fourth qualifier

References

External links
 1999 Nottingham Open Singles draw
 ITF tournament profile

Singles